Vilnius University Šiauliai Academy, established in 1997, is located in Šiauliai, Lithuania. As of 2008, the University was attended by approximately 11,800 students.

History 
Šiauliai University was founded by a merger of the Šiauliai Pedagogical Institute and the Šiauliai Polytechnical Faculty of the Kaunas University of Technology. The latter had been a branch of the former Kaunas Polytechnical Institute branch since 1959. On 1st of January 2021 Šiauliai University become a part of Vilnius University and was renamed to Vilnius University Šiauliai Academy.

Structure 
The Academy has 3 institutes:

Institute of Education;

Institute of Regional Development;

Lifelong Learning Center.

Gallery

References

External links 
 

Vilnius University
 
Education in Šiauliai
Buildings and structures in Šiauliai
Universities in Lithuania
1997 establishments in Lithuania
2021 establishments in Lithuania
Educational institutions established in 1997
Educational institutions established in 2021